Steph's Packed Lunch (formerly aired as The Steph Show) is a daytime television programme in the UK that is broadcast on Channel 4 each weekday afternoon. The show is presented by English journalist and broadcaster Steph McGovern. The show is live and features items including showbiz interviews, food, news and consumer advice. It is broadcast from Leeds Dock.

Format 

The show features a live audience with regular guests such as Anton Du Beke, Denise van Outen, and Greg Wise. In addition, the show typically features celebrity guests with cooking and lifestyle segments and the "One O'Clock Views" which covers the day's headlines.

The show starts broadcasting at 12:30pm which makes it rival ITV's Loose Women.

History

As The Steph Show 
In late 2019, Channel 4 announced that a new live daytime programme presented by McGovern called The Steph Show had been commissioned, with a specially built studio overlooking Leeds Docks.

The Steph Show started broadcasting on 30 March 2020 after being bought forward, just one week after lockdown was announced. After leaving BBC Breakfast, several senior BBC staff worked on her new programme.

COVID-19 pandemic 
As a result of the coronavirus lockdown The Steph Show started broadcasting from McGovern's house. However, this caused logistical problems and it was announced that the show would be taken off air for a while. It was later announced in Summer 2020 that The Steph Show had been rebranded as Steph's Packed Lunch.

As Steph's Packed Lunch 
The renamed show started on 14 September 2020. In February 2021, McGovern announced on Twitter that the show had been commissioned for another series. In July 2021, comedian Joe Lycett stormed off the set of the show as a stunt for raising awareness of white plastics and recycling for his consumer show Joe Lycett's Got Your Back. For Channel 4's Black to Front Day (10 September 2021), former Spice Girl Mel B presented the show advocating for greater diversity.

References

External links 

Steph's Packed Lunch at All 4

2020 British television series debuts
2020s British television talk shows
Channel 4 talk shows
English-language television shows